FIITJEE is a coaching institute for JEE and other competitive exams founded by Dinesh Kumar Goel. It has a pan-India network of 67 branches in 43 cities, along with branches in Bahrain and Qatar. It offers courses for students of grades 6 to 12 aspiring to appear in Joint Entrance Examination (JEE), JEE advanced, NTSE, KVPY, JSTSE, INChO, INMO, INPhO and various other examinations.

History 
DK Goel, a Mechanical Engineering Graduate from IIT Delhi founded FIITJEE in 1992. The institute offers aspiring engineering students a launchpad to create a career in Engineering.

Controversies

2009 AIEEE and IIT-JEE topper 
The 2009 IIT-JEE topper Nitin Jain who trained for his exams at FIITJEE said that he had been coerced into writing a letter of recommendation which they (FIITJEE) had published in their advertisements. The institute opened a website where they published answers in the name of Jain. He and his father accused FIITJEE and another cram school, "Aakash" for "misusing" Jain's name "for commercial interest". Jain clarified that he had never attended the Aakash Institute. The Union Ministry for Human Resource Development referred the matter for an investigation by the Central Bureau of Investigation. FIITJEE denied the allegations.

Jain later wrote in his book The Secret of My Success that he was "subtly pressurised" and "cajoled into writing the letter, and most of it was not true." FIITJEE moved the Delhi High Court claiming that parts of the book were "defamatory, offensive and fallacious" and sought a permanent injunction on the book's publication. The High Court dismissed the appeal, citing that the institute needed to prove that what the writer had published in his book was wrong. Jain and his father said that Nitin had received lesser amount under the institute's Talent Reward Exam than what the institute claimed and that too after several rounds of the institute's office.

Refund cases 
FIITJEE has faced several cases in Consumer Courts for not returning the fees paid by students when they quit the institute. In one of such cases in April 2017, the Hyderabad district consumer court directed FIITJEE to return 75% of the fees paid upfront and pay compensation of ₹1 lakh to parents. A Nagpur district forum ruled out that the coaching classes taking advance fees was a discrepancy and directed FIITJEE to refund ₹75,000 to a student who had enrolled in a 4-year program but left it following the lack of discipline and a biology teacher for two years.

Paradise Papers 
On  6 November 2017 the Paradise Papers revealed that 19,52,907 shares of FIITJEE valued at ₹36 crore were sold by QLearn company of Mauritius to Mumbai's Ambit Group in July 2015. QLearn is a subsidiary of Qatari firm Qinvest and the Ambit Group is one of the investors in it.

References

Organisations based in Delhi
Organizations established in 1992
Education companies of India
Cram schools in India
Education companies established in 1992
Indian companies established in 1992